Big South Cape Island or Taukihepa is an offshore island of New Zealand to the west of the southern tip of Stewart Island / Rakiura. The island has no permanent inhabitants but muttonbirders visit the island to catch the sooty shearwater, known in New Zealand as a "muttonbird".

Māori named the island "Taukihepa" and Europeans, who arrived later, called it "Big South Cape". The island was given dual names in 2001 as part of a Treaty of Waitangi settlement with Ngāi Tahu.

Surrounding smaller islands include Poutama Island to the south, Putauhina Island and the Putauhina Nuggets to the northwest, and Solomon Island to the north. Named features on the island include two inlets – Murderers Cove in the central east coast and Puwai Bay in the island's southwest.

Rat invasion

Maori muttonbirders had traditionally visited the island each summer to hunt sooty shearwaters (muttonbirds) that came to nest on the island in the spring. In March 1964, muttonbirders arrived to find the island had been devastated by the effect of rats that were causing one of New Zealand's greatest ecological disasters of the twentieth century. Previously free of mammalian predators, the ecology of the island was devastated in a matter of years and many endemic species of bird (some flightless) were driven to extinction. The surviving biomass of insect and bird life has been heavily reduced. An eradication programme was initiated to rid the island of rats and the island was rat-free again in 2006.

Animals that became extinct

Despite intervention by the New Zealand Wildlife Service that trapped and transferred some surviving birds to other, rat free, off-shore islands, two species of bird did not survive and became extinct. These were Stead's bush wren and the South Island snipe. The New Zealand greater short-tailed bat also became extinct.

See also 
 Conservation in New Zealand
 List of Antarctic and subantarctic islands
 List of islands of New Zealand
 New Zealand Subantarctic Islands

References

External links 
 Natural History New Zealand – Island Eaten by Rats, a television programme about the rat problem

Stewart Island
Island restoration
Islands of Southland, New Zealand